Pachal is a village in Tiruvannamalai district, Tamil Nadu, India.

Geography
It is located at an elevation of 298 m from MSL.

Location
National Highway 66 passes through Pachal.

References

Villages in Tiruvannamalai district